John Everard (died 1445), of Salisbury, Wiltshire, was an English politician.

He was a Member (MP) of the Parliament of England for Great Bedwyn in 1420 and Old Sarum in 1423.

References

Year of birth missing
1445 deaths
English MPs 1420
People from Salisbury
Members of Parliament for Great Bedwyn
Members of Parliament for Old Sarum
English MPs 1423